Sharon Choi (born Choi Sung-jae; 1994 or 1995) is a South Korean interpreter and film director. She received widespread recognition and praise as Bong Joon-ho's Korean–English interpreter during the 2019–2020 film awards season.

Early life and education
Choi was born in 1994 or 1995 in Seoul, South Korea. She moved to the United States at a young age and returned to Korea when she was ten years old. Choi attended the Hankuk Academy of Foreign Studies in Yongin and the School of Cinematic Arts at the University of Southern California.

Career
During the press tour for the 2018 film Burning, Choi interpreted for director Lee Chang-dong. She met Bong Joon-ho in April 2019 when she was asked to interpret for one of his phone interviews, and accompanied him at the 2019 Cannes Film Festival, where his film Parasite won the Palme d'Or. Choi continued as Bong's interpreter throughout the 2019–2020 film awards season, including at the 77th Golden Globe Awards, the 72nd Writers Guild of America Awards, and the 92nd Academy Awards. In May 2021, she interpreted for Bong as he presented the award for Best Director at the 93rd Academy Awards.

The success of Parasite resulted in widespread visibility for Choi, and she received praise from industry figures and audiences for her nuanced interpretations of Bong's speeches and interviews. Zack Sharf of IndieWire described Choi as "the undisputed MVP of Oscar season", and The Korea Herald credited her with generating excitement for Parasite among American audiences in the run-up to the Academy Awards. Some people in South Korea practiced English by watching videos of Choi's interpretations. She gained an internet fanbase and was frequently praised on Twitter and in the comments sections of Bong's interviews. In July 2020, she received the YoungSan Diplomat Award from the nonprofit Seoul Forum for International Affairs for "her role in enhancing South Korea's national image".

In addition to her work as an interpreter, Choi is a film director and producer. She directed Self Portrait, a short film that was screened at CAAMFest in 2019. She co-produced the 2020 short film Mother of Three, directed by Han Jun-hee. In February 2020, TheWrap reported that Choi was working on a screenplay about the awards season. She later refuted the reports in a Variety essay and instead announced that she was writing a screenplay for a film set in Korea. Bong himself has publicly expressed interest in Choi's scripts.

In 2021, Choi hosted the StrangeLand audio podcast alongside Ben Adair, about the 2003 Miracle Mile Murders in Koreatown.

References

1990s births
Interpreters
Living people
People from Seoul
South Korean film directors
South Korean film producers
South Korean screenwriters
South Korean women film directors
USC School of Cinematic Arts alumni
South Korean women film producers
Women screenwriters